"Do You Know What I'm Saying?" is the third and final single released from Wendy James' debut solo album Now Ain't the Time for Your Tears. The single was released in 1993 and was written by Elvis Costello.

Of the collection of songs Costello gave to James for her album, she singled out "Do You Know What I'm Saying?" as her personal favorite.

Track listing
CD single/Maxi single
"Do You Know What I'm Saying?" – 5:16
"I Started the Lie" – 4:49 (Wendy James/Neil Taylor)
"The Reigning Beauty Queen" – 4:44 (James/Taylor)

Maxi double
"Do You Know What I'm Saying?" – 5:16
"The Whole Damn Thing" – 4:45
"Sugar Takes Her Coffee Black" – 4:05

Charts

References

1993 singles
Songs written by Elvis Costello
Song recordings produced by Chris Kimsey
1993 songs
MCA Records singles